Brian Byrne (born 1975) is a Canadian singer-songwriter.

Brian or Bryan Byrne may also refer to:

 Brian Byrne (boxer) (born 1956), Irish Olympic boxer
 Brian Byrne (squash player) (born 1984), Irish squash player
 Brian L. Byrne (born 1942), Australian social scientist
 Bryan Byrne (footballer) (born 1983), Irish soccer player
 Bryan Byrne (rugby union) (born 1993), Irish rugby union player

See also
 Brian Oswald Donn-Byrne (1889–1928), Irish novelist
 Brian Beirne (born 1946), American radio DJ
 Brian O'Byrne (disambiguation)
 Brian Burns (disambiguation)